The Sainte-Anne River (in French: rivière Sainte-Anne) flows successively in the unorganized territory of Petit-Lac-Sainte-Anne and in the municipalities of Saint-Onésime-d'Ixworth, in the Kamouraska Regional County Municipality, in the administrative region of Bas-Saint-Laurent, in Quebec, in Canada.

The Sainte-Anne river is a tributary of the east bank of Grande Rivière, which flows on the east bank of the Ouelle River which empties in turn on the south shore of the St. Lawrence River at the height of Rivière-Ouelle.

Geography 
The Sainte-Anne River has its source at Petit lac Sainte-Anne which is connected to lac Saint-Anne, located to the west of the first. This last lake straddles the boundary between the municipality of Sainte-Perpétue. These bodies of water are part of the unorganized territory of Petit-Lac-Sainte-Anne, located in the heart of Notre Dame Mountains.

  towards the north-west, cutting the Canadian National railway line at the beginning of this segment, to the limit of the municipality of Saint-Onésime-d'Ixworth;
  westward into Saint-Onésime-d'Ixworth, to its confluence.

The Sainte-Anne river flows on the east bank of La Grande Rivière.

Toponymy 
The toponym “rivière Sainte-Anne” was formalized on December 5, 1968, by the Commission de toponymie du Québec.

See also 

 List of rivers of Quebec

References 

Rivers of Bas-Saint-Laurent
Kamouraska Regional County Municipality